Francis Lewis Cardozo (February 1, 1836 – July 22, 1903) was an American clergyman, politician, and educator. When elected in South Carolina as Secretary of State in 1868, he was the first African American to hold a statewide office in the United States.

Born free during the slavery time in Charleston, South Carolina to a mother who was a free woman of color, and a Sephardic Jew, Francis Cardozo studied at University of Glasgow and later at seminary.  He served as a minister in New Haven, Connecticut, before returning to South Carolina in 1865 with the American Missionary Association to establish schools for freedmen after the American Civil War.

After working in South Carolina during Reconstruction, Cardozo received an appointment in 1878 at the U.S. Department of Treasury in Washington, D.C. Later he served twelve years as principal of a major public high school, and lived in the nation's capital for the rest of his life.

Early years
Francis Cardozo was born free in 1836 in Charleston as the second of three sons of Lydia Williams Weston, a free woman of color, and Isaac Nunez Cardozo, a Sephardic Jewish man who had a position at the US Customhouse in the port city. The children were born free because their mother was free. His parents had a common-law marriage, as state law prevented interracial marriage. Francis had two sisters, Lydia and Eslander, an older brother, Henry Cardozo, and a younger brother, Thomas Whitmarsh Cardozo. Their father arranged for the boys to attend a private school open to free people of color.

Isaac died in 1855, disrupting the stability and economic safety of the family.

Francis Cardozo went to Scotland for higher education. In 1858, he enrolled at the University of Glasgow. Later, he attended seminaries in Edinburgh and London. He was ordained a Presbyterian minister.

After returning to the United States, in 1864 Francis Cardozo became pastor of the Temple Street Congregational Church in New Haven, Connecticut. On 20 Dec 1864, he married Catherine Romena (aka Minnie) Howell, a stepdaughter of the Rev. Amos Beman, noted abolitionist and former pastor of the same Temple Street Church. Francis and Minnie had seven children through their marriage; two died young, leaving four sons and a daughter.

Return to South Carolina, 1865
In 1865, Francis Cardozo returned to Charleston as an agent of the American Missionary Association (AMA). He succeeded his younger brother, Thomas Cardozo, as superintendent of an AMA school. The AMA established both primary schools and colleges for freedmen in the South in the post-Civil War years.

Cardozo developed this school as the Avery Normal Institute, one of the first free secondary schools for African Americans. It was established to train teachers, as freedmen sought education for their children and themselves as one of their highest priorities. In the 21st century, the Avery Institute has been incorporated as part of the College of Charleston.

Political career
Francis Cardozo became active in the Republican Party in South Carolina and was elected as a delegate to the 1868 South Carolina constitutional convention. As chair of the education committee, he advocated establishing integrated public schools in the state. The legislature ratified a new constitution in 1868 that provided for public schools for the first time in the state, and supported them to be integrated.

He was elected Secretary of State in South Carolina in 1868, and was the first African American to hold a statewide office in the United States. Cardozo reformed the South Carolina Land Commission, which distributed limited amounts of land to former slaves. During his term as secretary of state, he was chosen as professor of Latin at Howard University in Washington, D.C., and advised the governor of his intention to resign. The governor helped approve an arrangement by which Cardozo could retain his state office and also teach at Howard. A deputy was appointed during this period. He taught at Howard until March 1872.

Francis Cardozo was elected as state treasurer in 1872. After he did not cooperate with corruption, some Democratic legislators unsuccessfully tried to impeach Cardozo in 1874. He was reelected in 1874 and 1876, although the latter election was one in which Democrats swept most offices and took over control of the state legislature and governor's seat.

South Carolina elections, as in other southern states, had been increasingly marked by violence as Democrats sought to suppress the black Republican vote. The 1876 gubernatorial election season was also violent and featured widespread fraud at the polls and disputes over counts. In the end, white Democrats regained control of the state government after a compromise at the national level in 1877 led to the federal government abandoning Reconstruction. This included the removal of remaining federal troops from the South that year and other steps, including supporting Democrat Wade Hampton III's claim for the governorship in a disputed election. As customary in a change of administrations, Hampton demanded the resignation of Cardozo and other members of the earlier government; Francis left office on May 1, 1877.

The Democrats prosecuted Cardozo for conspiracy in November 1877. Despite questionable evidence, he was found guilty and served over six months in jail. After the federal government dropped election fraud charges against some Democrats, Cardozo was pardoned in 1879 by Democratic Governor William Dunlap Simpson.

In 1878 Cardozo was appointed to a Washington, D.C., position in the Treasury Department under Secretary John Sherman. He served in that position for six years, during which time he worked on education policy for the city of Washington. It was administered by the federal government

Educator
In 1884, Francis Cardozo returned to education as a principal of the Colored Preparatory High School in Washington, DC. He introduced a business curriculum and made it a leading school for African Americans. He served as principal until 1896.

Cardozo was a distant relative of future United States Supreme Court Justice Benjamin N. Cardozo, who was born in New York of another branch of the family. Francis's granddaughter, Eslanda Cardozo Goode, studied chemistry in college and was an anthropologist, author, actor and civil rights activist. She married renowned singer and political activist Paul Robeson.

Legacy and honors
In 1928, the Department of Business Practice was reorganized as a high school in Northwest Washington, D.C. It was named Cardozo Senior High School in Francis Cardozo's honor.

In popular culture
In the 1994 historical drama North and South, Book III, Francis Cardozo was portrayed by actor Billy Dee Williams.

References

Further reading
 Burke, W. Lewis. "Reconstruction corruption and the redeemers’ prosecution of Francis Lewis Cardozo." American Nineteenth Century History 2.3 (2001): 67–106.
 Burke, W. Lewis. "Post-Reconstruction Justice: The Prosecution and Trial of Francis Lewis Cardozo." South Carolina Law Review 53 (2001): 361+.
 Richardson, Joe M. "Francis L. Cardozo: Black educator during reconstruction." Journal of Negro Education 48.1 (1979): 73–83.  in JSTOR

1836 births
1903 deaths
Politicians from Charleston, South Carolina
Secretaries of State of South Carolina
Schoolteachers from South Carolina
American people of Portuguese-Jewish descent
African-American people in South Carolina politics
American people of Portuguese descent
Recipients of American gubernatorial pardons
South Carolina Republicans
Washington, D.C., Republicans
State treasurers of South Carolina
African-American Christian clergy
American Christian clergy
American Presbyterian ministers
African-American politicians during the Reconstruction Era
South Carolina politicians convicted of crimes
Alumni of the University of Glasgow
American expatriates in the United Kingdom
19th-century American educators
19th-century American clergy
20th-century African-American people